The second Anastasiades government was the government of Cyprus, forming the Council of Ministers. Sworn in on 1 March 2018, it consisted of members from President Nicos Anastasiades' Democratic Rally party (DISY) and independent technocrats. Many of its members carried over from the first Anastasiades government.

Council of Ministers

Notes: § retained from the First Anastasiades government.

References

Government of Cyprus
Anastasiades 2
2018 establishments in Cyprus
Cabinets established in 2018
2010s in Cypriot politics
Cabinets disestablished in 2023